Mongrassano is a town and comune of the province of Cosenza in the Calabria region of southern Italy, located 42 kilometers northwest of Cosenza.

The town is part of the Comunità Montana Media Valle Crate.

History 

Mongrassano already existed in the 12th century, known as Mons Crasanus, Moncressano, Mocrasani, Montegrassano or Magrosani. It was originally divided in two hamlets: Serra di Leo and Mongrassano. Like many other Albanian-origin settlements the urban structure was based on the gijtonia, in other words, circular streets.  Either in 1459 or early in the 16th century, another group of Albanian political refugees came and settled in Mongrassano.

On 20 July 1459 the Prince of Bisignano gave the civil jurisdiction of the city to the Bishop of San Marco. In 1642 the Gaetani acquired the territory; in 1688 they sold the property to the Marquesses of Fuscaldo, who held it until the end of the feudal system in 1806. In 1807 Mongrassano became state owned and in 1811 it joined with Serra di Leo. In 1816 it was elevated to the level of a comune, with Serra di Leo as its frazione.

Language and dialect 

Officially the inhabitants speak Italian. Traditionally, the dialect is of Albanian origin (Arbëresh), but is spoken by an increasingly restricted number of inhabitants.

Festivals
The patron saint of Mongrassano is Saint Catherine of Siena, but the most important festival in the town is Saint Lucy that occurs during the month of August.

References

External links
 http://www.arbitalia.it/index.htm
 http://www.comuni-italiani.it/078/080/
 http://calabria.indettaglio.it/eng/comuni/cs/mongrassano/mongrassano.html

Arbëresh settlements
Cities and towns in Calabria